Petros Geromichalos (alternate spellings: Peter) (born June 9, 1994) is a Greek professional basketball player and the team captain for Lavrio of the Greek Basket League. He can play at either the center or power forward positions, with power forward being his main position.

Youth career
Geromichalos started playing basketball in Thessaloniki, with the junior teams of Aris Thessaloniki, where he stayed until 2013. With Aris' junior club, he won the Greek junior league.

Professional career
After Aris, Geromichalos joined Machites Doxas Pefkon, where he played in the semi-pro level Greek 3rd division, and became the best scorer of the team. He began his pro career in 2015, when he joined Promitheas Patras of the Greek 2nd Division. With Promitheas, he played in the top-tier level Greek Basket League, for the first time, in the 2016–17 season. 

On August 16, 2019, Geromichalos signed with Ionikos Nikaias. His stint in Nikaia was brief, as he was subsequently moved to Lavrio on September 23 of the same year, on a loan spell from Promitheas. 

On July 24, 2020, Geromichalos renewed his contract with Lavrio for another season. During the very successful for the club 2020-21 season, he averaged 6.2 points, 3.5 rebounds, 1.9 assists, and 0.6 steals per contest, in 20 games total. On July 7, 2021, Geromichalos renewed his contract with Lavrio for another year. In 22 league games during the 2021-22 campaign, Geromichalos averaged 4.9 points, 3.2 rebounds, 1.8 assists and 0.6 steals, playing around 19 minutes per contest. 

Geromichalos was named team captain before the start of the 2022-2023 season, following the departures of Vassilis Mouratos and Dimitris Kaklamanakis.

References

External links
FIBA Champions League Profile
Eurobasket.com Profile
RealGM.com Profile
Greek Basket League Profile
Greek Basket League Profile  

1994 births
Living people
Greek men's basketball players
Machites Doxas Pefkon B.C. players
Basketball players from Larissa
Power forwards (basketball)
Lavrio B.C. players
Promitheas Patras B.C. players